Galium humifusum (spreading bedstraw) is a plant species in the Rubiaceae. Its native range stretches from the Black Sea region (Greece, Turkey, Bulgaria, Romania, Ukraine, Belarus, Russia, Caucasus) to Iran, Central Asia, Pakistan, Xinjiang, Mongolia and a few smaller countries. The species has also been regarded as a waif in the wild in Washington state in the United States.

References

External links
Photo of herbarium specimen at Missouri Botanical Garden, collected 1834 in what is now the Republic of Georgia, Galium humifusum
 Плантариум  Плантариум определитель растений on-line, Galium humifusum M. Bieb. Описание таксона
Gardening Europe
Turkiye Bitkileri, Galium humifusum 

humifusum
Flora of Greece
Flora of Cyprus
Flora of Mongolia
Flora of Xinjiang
Flora of Georgia (country)
Flora of Central Asia
Flora of Pakistan
Flora of Afghanistan
Flora of Iran
Flora of Iraq
Flora of Syria
Flora of Palestine (region)
Flora of Azerbaijan
Flora of Armenia
Flora of Russia
Flora of Belarus
Flora of Ukraine
Flora of Bulgaria
Flora of Turkey
Plants described in 1808